Cynthia Lynch (born May 18, 1971) is an American professional wrestler. While in the World Wrestling Federation, she became the first of four women to win the company's Hardcore Championship.

Professional wrestling career

Early career (1996–1999)
After being a professional wrestling fan as a child, Lynch made her debut in wrestling as a valet in December 1996 on the Northeastern independent circuit with help from her childhood friend Dawn Marie Psaltis. She managed many popular wrestlers in that area including Steve Corino, Rik Ratchet, Pat Kenney and The Inferno Kid. Soon after that, she began training to wrestle, and participated in many mixed tag matches. She had her first singles match in February 1998 where she lost to Little Jeanne, then known as Sweet Destiny. On July 24, 1999, she won the NWA New Jersey Junior Heavyweight Championship from Kevin Knight.

World Wrestling Federation (1999–2000)
In 1999, she caught the eye of Tom Prichard, who was then a talent scout/trainer for the World Wrestling Federation (WWF), and in July 1999 signed a developmental contract with WWF. She began training with Prichard soon after. In October 1999, she made an appearance on Raw as one of The Godfather's Hos and was attacked by Viscera. Soon after that, she was sent to WWF's then developmental territory Memphis Championship Wrestling (MCW) for further training and development. While there she had feuds with The Kat, Jasmin St. Claire, Molly Holly and Victoria. In May 2000, she made three more televised appearances in the WWF as one of The Godfather's hos, briefly winning the Hardcore Championship from Crash Holly. Holly quickly pinned her to regain the title. When the WWF dropped MCW as one of their developmental territories in December 2000, she (along with some of the others training there) was released from her contract.

Total Nonstop Action Wrestling (2002)
In the summer of 2002, she worked briefly for Total Nonstop Action Wrestling (TNA) as David Young's valet.

Independent circuit (2001–2009)
Afterward, she returned to working for several other independent feds on the east coast, including Glory, GLOOW/DWOW, WEW, among others. On July 12, 2007, Lynch, as Principal Lazarus teamed with Roni Jonah to capture the Women's Extreme Wrestling Tag Team Championship against Annie Social and Amy Zidian (substituting for Sumie Sakai). On December 14, 2007 Lazarus and Roni successfully defended their tag team titles against Becky Bayless and Lucy Furr at the WEW event "Tit For Tat". On March 20, 2009, she wrestled at Firestorm Pro Wrestling against Sassy Stephie in a match that featured April Hunter as the guest referee.

Ohio Valley Wrestling (2012)
In 2012, Lynch joined Ohio Valley Wrestling, and unsuccessfully challenged Taeler Hendrix for the OVW Women's Championship. At Saturday Night Special on February 4, she teamed with C.J. Lane to lose to Aleida Ortiz and Taeler Hendrix. On February 8, she lost a six-person mixed tag team match with Bull Bronson and Epiphany to Paredyse, C.J. Lane and Taeler Hendrix. In March 2012, Lynch became a valet of X2C (Sean Casey and Raphael Constantine), along with Miss Cinnamon Twist, SoulFire Bay and Terri Kendall.

Championships and accomplishments
New-Wave Championship Wrestling
NWCW Women's Championship.
NWA New Jersey
NWA New Jersey Junior Heavyweight Championship (1 time)
Women's Extreme Wrestling
WEW Tag Team Championship (1 time) - with Roni Jonah
World Wrestling Federation
WWF Hardcore Championship (1 time)

References

External links 
 G.L.O.R.Y. biography
 

1971 births
American female professional wrestlers
Living people
Professional wrestlers from Kentucky
Professional wrestling managers and valets
Sportspeople from Louisville, Kentucky
Sportspeople from New York City
WWF/WWE Hardcore Champions
21st-century American women
20th-century professional wrestlers
21st-century professional wrestlers